Tulipa serbica is a species of tulip native to southeastern Serbia and northern Kosovo. It is closely related to Tulipa scardica but displays certain morphological differences in the perianth segments, acute anthers, and staminal filaments.

References

serbica
Ephemeral plants
Flora of Kosovo
Flora of Serbia
Plants described in 1997